Arashic is the sixth studio album of the Japanese boy band Arashi. The album was released on July 5, 2006 in Japan under their record label J Storm in two editions: a limited CD+DVD version and a regular CD version. The album was the first album of the group to be released not only in Japan, but in Hong Kong, South Korea, Taiwan and Thailand as well. In Korea, the first 10,000 copies of the album were sold out on the first day and topped the non-Korean sales charts in the third week of July. The album was released digitally on February 7, 2020.

Album information
The regular edition contains a bonus track and a 32-page booklet, while the limited edition contains a DVD with a digest of the group's live concert, One Summer Concert Tour. The album also contains the singles "Kitto Daijōbu" and "Wish," the theme song for the Japanese television drama Hana Yori Dango. For this album, instead of solo songs, the group did "pick-up" songs with one member singing as lead vocalist and the rest backing as support.

Track listing

Charts and certifications

Weekly charts

Year-end charts

Sales and certifications

Release history

References

External links
 Arashic production information 
 Arashic Oricon profile 
 

Arashi albums
2006 albums
J Storm albums